Cori Blakebrough (born 30 July 1967 in Chatham, Ontario) is a Canadian former basketball player who competed in the 2000 Summer Olympics.

References

1967 births
Living people
Canadian women's basketball players
Olympic basketball players of Canada
Basketball players at the 2000 Summer Olympics